Michael Switak (born 29 December 1973) is an Austrian fencer. He competed in the individual and team épée events at the 2000 Summer Olympics.

References

1973 births
Living people
Austrian male fencers
Austrian épée fencers
Olympic fencers of Austria
Fencers at the 2000 Summer Olympics
Sportspeople from Innsbruck